The Samsung SGH-A561, also known as Samsung A746, is a flip open or folding mobile phone released by Samsung corporation in August 2008. It has both 2G (GSM 850 / 900 / 1800 / 1900) and 3G network (HSDPA 850 / 1900) as well as EDGE for faster internet access.

Camera 
It was one of the first swiveling camera phones, in which the 2.0-megapixel camera can rotate back and front, providing the user with more control over taking pictures and video calling.

Memory 
The phone has an internal memory of 50 MB and can hold up to 4 GB on a microSD. This allows for 1,000 entries in the phone book, and 20 dialed, received and missed calls in the call records.

Features 
 Messaging - SMS, EMS, MMS, em-ail, instant messaging
 Browser   - WAP 2.0/xHTML, HTML
 Games
 Java - MIDP 2.0
 Video - MP4/3gp player
App
Voice memo
Organizer
World clock
Stopwatch
Countdown timer

References 

A561
Mobile phones introduced in 2008